The World Intellectual Property Organization Copyright Treaty (WIPO Copyright Treaty or WCT) is an international treaty on copyright law adopted by the member states of the World Intellectual Property Organization (WIPO) in 1996. It provides additional protections for copyright to respond to advances in information technology since the formation of previous copyright treaties before it. As of August 2021, the treaty has 110 contracting parties. The WCT and WIPO Performances and Phonograms Treaty, are together termed WIPO "internet treaties".

History 
During the earlier stages of negotiations, the WCT was seen as a protocol to the Berne Convention, constituting an update of that agreement since the 1971 Stockholm Conference. However, as any amendment to the Berne Convention required unanimous consent of all parties, the WCT was conceptualized as an additional treaty which supplemented the Berne Convention. The collapse of negotiations around the extension of the Berne Convention during the 1980s saw the shifting of the forum to the GATT, resulting in the TRIPS Agreement. Thus, the nature of any copyright treaty by the World Intellectual Property Organization became considerably narrower, being limited to addressing the challenges posed by digital technologies.

Protection granted by the Treaty 
The WCT emphasizes the incentive nature of copyright protection, claiming its importance to creative endeavours. It ensures that computer programs are protected as literary works (Article 4), and that the arrangement and selection of material in databases is protected (Article 5). It provides authors of works with control over their rental and distribution in Articles 6 to 8, which they may not have under the Berne Convention alone. It also prohibits circumvention of technological measures for the protection of works (Article 11) and unauthorized modification of rights management information contained in works (Article 12).

The treaty has been criticised for being too broad (for example in its prohibition of circumvention of technical protection measures, even where such circumvention is used in the pursuit of legal and fair use rights) and for applying a "one size fits all" standard to all signatory countries, despite their widely differing stages of economic development and knowledge industry.

Implementation
The WIPO Copyright Treaty is implemented in United States law by the Digital Millennium Copyright Act (DMCA). By Decision 2000/278/EC of 16 March 2000, the Council of the European Union approved the treaty on behalf of the European Community. European Union Directives which largely cover the subject matter of the treaty are: Directive 91/250/EC, creating copyright protection for software; Directive 96/9/EC on copyright protection for databases; and Directive 2001/29/EC, prohibiting devices for circumventing "technical protection measures", such as digital rights management (also known as DRM).

See also 
List of parties to international copyright agreements
Agreement on Trade-Related Aspects of Intellectual Property Rights (TRIPs)
Software patents under TRIPs Agreement
WIPO Performances and Phonograms Treaty (WPPT)
Anti-Counterfeiting Trade Agreement

References

External links and references

The full text of the WIPO Copyright Treaty (adopted in Geneva on December 20, 1996)  in the WIPO Lex database – official website of WIPO.
Parties to the Treaty

Copyright law
Copyright treaties
Copyright Treaty
Treaties concluded in 1996
Treaties entered into force in 2002
Treaties of Albania
Treaties of Algeria
Treaties of Armenia
Treaties of Argentina
Treaties of Australia
Treaties of Azerbaijan
Treaties of Bahrain
Treaties of Belarus
Treaties of Belgium
Treaties of Benin
Treaties of Botswana
Treaties of Brunei
Treaties of Bulgaria
Treaties of Burkina Faso
Treaties of Burundi
Treaties of Canada
Treaties of Chile
Treaties of the People's Republic of China
Treaties of Colombia
Treaties of Costa Rica
Treaties of Cyprus
Treaties of Croatia
Treaties of the Czech Republic
Treaties of Denmark
Treaties of the Dominican Republic
Treaties of Ecuador
Treaties of El Salvador
Treaties of Estonia
Treaties entered into by the European Union
Treaties of Finland
Treaties of France
Treaties of Gabon
Treaties of Georgia (country)
Treaties of Germany
Treaties of Ghana
Treaties of Greece
Treaties of Guatemala
Treaties of Guinea
Treaties of Honduras
Treaties of Indonesia
Treaties of Ireland
Treaties of Italy
Treaties of Jamaica
Treaties of Japan
Treaties of Jordan
Treaties of Kazakhstan
Treaties of Kyrgyzstan
Treaties of Latvia
Treaties of Liechtenstein
Treaties of Lithuania
Treaties of Luxembourg
Treaties of North Macedonia
Treaties of Madagascar
Treaties of Malaysia
Treaties of Mali
Treaties of Malta
Treaties of Mexico
Treaties of Moldova
Treaties of Mongolia
Treaties of Montenegro
Treaties of Morocco
Treaties of the Netherlands
Treaties of Nicaragua
Treaties of Oman
Treaties of Panama
Treaties of Paraguay
Treaties of Peru
Treaties of the Philippines
Treaties of Poland
Treaties of Portugal
Treaties of Qatar
Treaties of Romania
Treaties of Russia
Treaties of Saint Lucia
Treaties of Senegal
Treaties of Serbia and Montenegro
Treaties of Singapore
Treaties of Slovakia
Treaties of Slovenia
Treaties of South Korea
Treaties of Spain
Treaties of Sweden
Treaties of Switzerland
Treaties of Tajikistan
Treaties of Togo
Treaties of Trinidad and Tobago
Treaties of Turkey
Treaties of Ukraine
Treaties of the United Arab Emirates
Treaties of the United Kingdom james rand 
Treaties of the United States
Treaties of Uruguay
1996 in Switzerland
Treaties extended to Greenland
Treaties extended to the Faroe Islands
Treaties extended to Hong Kong
Digital rights management